Tri- is a numerical prefix meaning three.  Tri or TRI may also refer to:

Places
 Tri-Cities Regional Airport, Tennessee, US, IATA code TRI
 Triangulum constellation, astronomical abbreviation Tri

People
Tri, Former nickname for wrestler Triple H
Tri Hartanto, Indonesian basketball player

Arts, entertainment, and media
 Tri (album), by Ana Stanić 
 Tri (novel), a Slovenian novel
 El Tri, Mexican rock group

Organizations
 Taipei Ricci Institute, an educational institute in Taiwan
 Tamalpais Research Institute, a virtual music venue, San Rafael, California, US
 Translational Research Institute (Australia)
 Transport Research Institute, in Scotland

Other uses
AC Tripoli, a Lebanese association football club
Total return index
 Toxics Release Inventory, US
 El Tri or El Tricolor, nicknames of the Mexico national football team
 Triangular function, tri(t)
 Trichloroethylene 
 Triple reuptake inhibitors